Colombian singer Camilo has released three studio albums, two mixtapes, and 19 singles, including nine as a featured artist and duets.

Albums

Studio albums

Mixtapes

Singles

As lead artist

As a featured artist

Promotional singles

Other charted songs and certifications

Other appearances

Notes

Songwriting credits

References

Camilo
Discographies of Colombian artists
Latin pop music discographies